Garhwa fort is a temple complex in Allahabad, Uttar Pradesh, India, belonging to the Gupta Period. The ruins of the temple were fortified in 18th century by Raja Baghel Raja Vikramaditya. The fortification consisted of square enclosure and parapets, giving a fortress kind of look. The temple has many relics belonging to the Gupta period, which date back to as old as 5th and 6th century. The most notable item in the fort is a figure representing all 10 avatars of Lord Vishnu, belonging to 11th or 12th century.

References 

Tourist attractions in Allahabad district
Gupta Empire
Forts in Uttar Pradesh